Phoenicurus is a genus of passerine birds in the Old World flycatcher family Muscicapidae, native to Europe, Asia and Africa. They are named redstarts from their orange-red tails ('start' is an old name for a tail). They are small insectivores, the males mostly brightly coloured in various combinations of red, blue, white, and black, the females light brown with a red tail. A molecular phylogenetic study published in 2010 led to a reorganization of the Old World flycatchers family in which the two species in Rhyacornis and the single species in Chaimarrornis were merged into Phoenicurus.

The genus Phoenicurus was introduced by the English naturalist Thomas Forster in 1817. The type species (by tautonymy) is the common redstart (Phoenicurus phoenicurus). The name Phoenicurus is from Ancient Greek φοινιξ (phoinix), "(Phoenician) crimson/purple" (see also Tyrian purple), and ουροσ (-ouros) -"tailed".
      
The genus contains the following species:
 Przevalski's redstart (Phoenicurus alaschanicus)
 Eversmann's redstart (Phoenicurus erythronotus)
 Blue-capped redstart (Phoenicurus coeruleocephala)
 Black redstart (Phoenicurus ochruros)
 Common redstart (Phoenicurus phoenicurus)
 Hodgson's redstart (Phoenicurus hodgsoni)
 White-throated redstart (Phoenicurus schisticeps)
 Daurian redstart (Phoenicurus auroreus)
 Moussier's redstart (Phoenicurus moussieri)
 Güldenstädt's redstart (Phoenicurus erythrogastrus)
 Blue-fronted redstart (Phoenicurus frontalis)
 Plumbeous water redstart (Phoenicurus fuliginosus) (previously in the genus Rhyacornis)
 Luzon water redstart (Phoenicurus bicolor) (previously in the genus Rhyacornis)
 White-capped redstart (Phoenicurus leucocephalus) (previously in the monotypic genus Chaimarrornis)

Fossil record
 Phoenicurus erikai (Pliocene of Csarnota, Hungary).
 Phoenicurus baranensis (Pliocene of Beremend, Hungary).

References

Further reading

 
Bird genera
Taxa named by Thomas Ignatius Maria Forster
Taxonomy articles created by Polbot